Kenneth Wayne Lanier (born July 8, 1959) is a former offensive tackle in the National Football League who played 14 seasons, 13 of those for the Denver Broncos.

References

1959 births
Living people
American football offensive tackles
Florida State Seminoles football players
Denver Broncos players
Los Angeles Raiders players